Courthouse is an American drama television series that ran on CBS from September 13 to November 15, 1995. The series was created and executive-produced by Deborah Joy LeVine. The Courthouse plot centered on a tough female judge, and was partially inspired by NYPD Blue and the television coverage of the O. J. Simpson murder case. Patricia Wettig led the cast which also included Bob Gunton and Robin Givens. Wettig intended to leave the show due to "creative differences", with sources saying that she wanted the show to be more of a star vehicle for her, rather than an ensemble cast, but the show was cancelled before her character could be written out.

The show included Jenifer Lewis and Cree Summer as the first recurring African American lesbian characters on TV, but the role was ordered to be toned down for broadcast. Lewis played Juvenile Court judge Rosetta Reide, who was having a relationship with her housekeeper Danny Gates (played by Summer).

The show failed to catch on with audiences, the pilot ranked 47 out of 108 shows, according to the Nielsen ratings for that week, with 9.2 million viewers (16% share), and it was cancelled two months after it premiered. One critic described the show as "a hopeless amalgam that strains the senses".

Synopsis
Courthouse is a TV drama with much sex and violence; it follows the lives of the judges and lawyers and all the staff at a big-city courthouse in fictional Clark County. The court has a limited budget and an overcrowded case load, and the courthouse itself is falling into disrepair.

The court is led by the no-nonsense presiding judge, Justine Parkes. Then, amid all the turmoil, Wyatt Jackson, a hunky new judge, arrives from Montana. He gets off to a shaky start with Parkes as he is not used to the way big-city courts are run, but there is a hint of romantic tension between the two.

There are several romantic couplings among the staff, including an interracial coupling of two prosecutors in Moore and Graham and a lesbian affair between Judge Reide and her housekeeper.

New York magazine described the show as follows:<blockquote>"Ready to believe in Robin Givens as a tireless defender of public justice? ''Courthouses idea of gritty moral realism is to divide the world into the good and the bad: Bad judges go to the opera while their charges die in jail; good judges have interracial affairs with members of their own gender; and the best judge of all rolls in from Montana looking like he just shot a 501 commercial".</blockquote>

CharactersJudge Justine Parkes (Patricia Wettig) – the no-nonsense presiding judgeJudge Homer Conklin (Bob Gunton) – an autocratic "hanging judge" and a by-the-book traditionalistJudge Wyatt E. Jackson (Brad Johnson) – a hunky, non-conformist recently arrived from MontanaJudge Myron Winkleman (Michael Lerner) – a neurotic Family Court judgeJudge Rosetta Reide (Jenifer Lewis) – a struggling, gay single mother presiding over Juvenile CourtJonathan Mitchell (Dan Gauthier) – conceited prosecutor, was dating public defender GilbertVeronica Gilbert (Nia Peeples) – public defender, dating MitchellEdison Moore (Jeffrey D. Sams) – hard-charging young prosecutor in a secret romantic relationship with GrahamSuzanne Graham (Robin Givens) – an investigator for the D.A.'s officeLenore Laderman (Annabeth Gish) – a naive young prosecutor just reassigned to the sex crimes unitDanny Gates''' (Cree Summer) – housekeeper and lesbian girlfriend of Judge Reide

Other cast members included Jacqueline Kim, Shelley Morrison, Roma Maffia, Christopher Michael, Larry Joshua, Kelly Rutherford, Cotter Smith, George Newbern, David L. Crowley and John Mese.

Episodes
</onlyinclude>

References

External links

1990s American drama television series
1995 American television series debuts
1995 American television series endings
1990s American legal television series
CBS original programming
English-language television shows
Lesbian-related television shows
Serial drama television series
Television series by Sony Pictures Television
1990s American LGBT-related drama television series
Television shows set in Nevada